John Laurie (7 April 1938 – 13 May 2006) was a South African cricketer. He played in three first-class matches for Border in 1963/64.

See also
 List of Border representative cricketers

References

External links
 

1938 births
2006 deaths
South African cricketers
Border cricketers
Sportspeople from Qonce